Patriarch Nicholas IV may refer to:

 Nicholas IV of Constantinople, Ecumenical Patriarch in 1147–1151
 Patriarch Nicholas IV of Alexandria, Greek Patriarch in 1412–1417